Jill-Michele Meleán (born June 29, 1979) is an American actress and stand-up comedian. She was a cast member of the sketch comedy series MADtv from 2002 to 2003.

Career 
Meleán (aka "Jilly") is a national touring headlining comedienne. After meeting Carlos Alazraqui on Reno 911! (she played his sister on the show), they toured together for years as standup comics. They also wrote and produced Witness Infection, a feature film that premiered at a film festival in 2020.

MADtv
Meleán joined the cast of MADtv in 2002 as a featured performer in its seventh season. She was the second Hispanic cast member to join the show (after Cuban-born Nelson Ascencio in 1999) and the first Latin female. Her first skit, a parody of Britney Spears' "Not a Girl" video, quickly gained her fans and notoriety, and she was promoted to repertory status for the following season. She also impersonated Kelly Osbourne, Jenna Bush, Asia Argento, Jennifer Lopez and Drew Barrymore, and replaced Kathryn Fiore's character in the Kappa Kappa Kappa Sorority sisters sketch.

Filmography

Film

Television

References

External links
 

1979 births
American film actresses
American impressionists (entertainers)
American television actresses
Hispanic and Latino American actresses
Living people
Actresses from Miami
American women comedians
American sketch comedians
21st-century American comedians
Comedians from Florida
21st-century American actresses